Cornelius Jakobus Steenkamp (born 20 February 1982) is a former South African rugby union player who made in excess of 150 appearances for the  in the Vodacom Cup and Currie Cup competitions.

He retired as a player at the end of 2014 to take over at the Pumas' forwards and conditioning coach.

Rugby career

Steenkamp was a member of the Leicester Tigers youth system before returning to his native South Africa, where he has been playing for the  since 2005.

References

South African rugby union players
Living people
1982 births
Pumas (Currie Cup) players
Rugby union flankers
People from Ermelo, Mpumalanga
Afrikaner people
Rugby union players from Mpumalanga